Spirit Catcher is a studio album by American jazz trumpeter Wadada Leo Smith which was recorded in 1979 and released on Nessa Records.

Background
Smith leads the New Dalta Akhri, a quintet with Dwight Andrews, Bobby Naughton, Wes Brown and Pheeroan akLaff, in two original compositions: "Images" and "Spirit Catcher". In addition, Smith prepared a very unusual piece for muted trumpet and three harps: "The Burning of Stones", a composition dedicated to Anthony Braxton with elements of two traditions involving harp-like instruments, the West African kora and the Japanese koto. The 2009 CD reissue adds an alternate version of this piece.

Reception

In his review for AllMusic, Scott Yanow states "This is thought-provoking music that grows in interest with each listen."
The All About Jazz review by Clifford Allen says "Recorded crisply by Rudy Van Gelder (unlike the somewhat murky Kabell LPs), Spirit Catcher presents Smith's earlier music with clarity and warmth."

Track listing
All compositions by Wadada Leo Smith
 "Images" - 19:09
 "The Burning of Stones" - 9:42
 "Spirit Catcher" - 9:43

Bonus track on CD
"The Burning of Stones" first version - 11:13

Personnel
Wadada Leo Smith - trumpet, flugelhorn
Dwight Andrews - clarinet, tenor sax, wooden flute
Bobby Naughton - vibraharp
Wes Brown - bass, wooden flute
Pheeroan AkLaff - drums
Irene Emanuel - harp 
Carol Emanuel - harp 
Ruth Emanuel - harp

References

1979 albums
Wadada Leo Smith albums
Nessa Records albums